Hey! is the debut studio album by Brazilian recording artist Jullie. It was released on September 22, 2009 by Deckdisc. After writing songs for several established acts, Jullie released this album. The main theme of the songs is girl power. The songs are mostly inspired by Jullie's love of youth, rebellion, and discover who you are in 4.modern lifestyle. Musically, the album drew inspiration from pop and pop rock influenced by singers like Lily Allen, Madonna, Alanis Morissette, and its main reference, Katy Perry, directed to a feminist position. The album was praised by the young, calling Jullie as "Brazilian Katy Perry" for his music style and way of dressing. The first single "Alice" was released in April and the second single "Hey!" was released in November, 2009.

Track listing

References

External links
 Official Website

2009 debut albums
Jullie albums